Lyubomir Nyagolov (born 8 March 1977) is a former Bulgarian footballer.

Career

Over the course of his playing days, Nyagolov donned the colours of Vihar (Aytos), Nesebar, Chernomorets Burgas, FC Ravda, Naftex and Lokomotiv (Stara Zagora).

References

1977 births
Living people
Bulgarian footballers
Association football defenders
FC Chernomorets Burgas players
Neftochimic Burgas players
Second Professional Football League (Bulgaria) players